Air Marshal Sir Sidney Weetman Rochford Hughes,  (25 October 1914 – 17 September 1996) was a Royal Air Force officer who served as Air Officer Commanding Far East Air Force from 1966 to 1969.

RAF career
Educated at Waitaki Boys' High School, Hughes was part of the editorial team at the New Zealand Herald from 1933. He joined the Royal New Zealand Air Force in 1937 but was transferred to the Royal Air Force in 1938. He served in the Second World War mainly in the Middle East and North Africa; after being shot down, he was taken prisoner in 1941 by a group of Italian soldiers near Benghazi, although he later turned the tables and took 130 Italians prisoner himself. He became Officer Commanding No. 511 Squadron in September 1945. After the war, he served as Officer Commanding the Royal Aircraft Establishment at Farnborough before becoming Station Commander at RAF Jever in 1955. He went on to be Air Officer Commanding No. 19 (Reconnaissance) Group in 1962 and Deputy Controller of Aircraft (RAF) at the Ministry of Aviation in 1964 before becoming Air Officer Commanding Far East Air Force in 1966 and retiring in 1969.

References

1914 births
1996 deaths
Military personnel from Auckland
British World War II prisoners of war
Commanders of the Order of the British Empire
Fellows of the Royal Aeronautical Society
Knights Commander of the Order of the Bath
New Zealand prisoners of war in World War II
People educated at Waitaki Boys' High School
New Zealand recipients of the Air Force Cross (United Kingdom)
Royal Air Force air marshals
Royal Air Force personnel of World War II
Royal New Zealand Air Force personnel
World War II prisoners of war held by Italy